Bradleys may refer to:
 Bradleys (fur retailers), British retailer established in 1860s
 Bradlees, American discount chain
 Bradleys Both, North Yorkshire, England

See also 
 Bradley (disambiguation)